Basquete Universo/Goiânia, or simply Universo/Goiânia, is Brazilian basketball team headquartered in Goiânia, Brazil. The team was founded in 2000, but it  ended its activities in 2006. In 2013 he resumed activities with the priority to reach a place in the main league in the country, Novo Basquete Brasil.

History 

The team of Univero/Goiânia was founded in 2000; the team achieved excellent results, especially the 2nd place in the Liga Sudamericana 2005  and the sixth state title (2000–2005), and the 3rd place in the Campeonato Brasileiro de Basquete, in 2004. But because of financial difficulties, ceased production in 2006.

In 2013, Universo/Goiânia returned to the Brazilian basketball to dispute  Copa Brasil Centro-Oeste de Basquete, where became champion, guaranteeing the right to dispute the vacant Super Copa Brasil de Basquete. In Super Copa Brasi, the team won all the games in the qualifying round against Caxias do Sul (86–81), Sport (99–75) and Rio Claro (88–78), taking the Fluminense in the semi final in a disputed game in which the team ended up losing by 106–108. In the dispute for third place, Universo/Goiânia played again against Rio Claro and won 100–92. Although the team did not have qualified to compete in the Tournament Access/Descent that gives access to 2013–14 NBB season, team presented a project to the Board of Directors of Liga Nacional de Basquete, who approved, on June 5, 2013, at a meeting held in the headquarters, in São Paulo, the requests of Fluminense and Universo/Goiânia to plead for a spot in the next edition of the NBB. Now, teams must still pass the technical evaluation, structural and financial, to be confirmed in next season's greatest basketball competition in the country.

Roster 

t

Honors

Regional
 Copa Brasil Centro-Oeste de Basquete:
 Winner: 2013

References

External links
Official Facebook page

Basketball teams in Brazil
2000 establishments in Brazil
Basketball teams established in 2000